Oceanobacillus chironomi is a bacterium. It is Gram-positive, motile by peritrichous flagella, endospore-forming, halotolerant and facultatively alkaliphilic. The type strain is T3944DT (=LMG 23627T =DSM 18262T).

References

Further reading
Staley, James T., et al. "Bergey's manual of systematic bacteriology, vol. 3."Williams and Wilkins, Baltimore, MD (1989): 2250–2251.

External links

LPSN
Type strain of Oceanobacillus chironomi at BacDive -  the Bacterial Diversity Metadatabase

Bacillaceae
Bacteria described in 2007